Hajduk (sometimes misspelled hadjuk) may refer to:

Hajduk, brigands active in the Balkans in the 16th to 19th centuries
Hajduk (Kingdom of Hungary), mercenary soldiers in 16th- and 17th-century Hungary
Hajduk (Polish–Lithuanian Commonwealth), bodyguards in 17th- and 18th-century Poland

It may also refer to the following sport clubs:
HNK Hajduk Split, Croatian football club
FK Hajduk Beograd, Serbian football club
FK Hajduk Kula, Serbian football club
FK Hajduk Veljko, Serbian football club

It may also refer to the following people:
Anja Hajduk (born 1963), German politician
Frankie Hejduk, American football (soccer) player
John Hejduk, American architect, artist and educator
Milan Hejduk, Czech ice hockey player
Stacy Haiduk, American actress

See also
Hajdú (disambiguation)